Amphilius brevis is a species of catfish in the genus Amphilius. It lives in the middle and upper Congo River in the Democratic Republic of the Congo. Its length reaches 8.4 cm.

References 

brevis
Freshwater fish of Central Africa
Fish described in 1902
Taxa named by George Albert Boulenger